Thomas Ryan (8 February 1915 – 21 August 1983) was an Irish prelate who served as Bishop of Clonfert.

Ryan was born in Kilcommon, County Tipperary. He was educated at St. Patrick's College, Thurles and ordained priest on 10 July 1938. He entered the holy see diplomatic service in 1943 and eventually became Secretary to Pope John XXIII. He was consecrated Diocesan Bishop of Clonfert on 16 June 1963. He resigned on 1 May 1982 and died on 21 August 1983.

References

Roman Catholic bishops of Clonfert
20th-century Roman Catholic bishops in Ireland
1915 births
1983 deaths
Alumni of St. Patrick's College, Thurles
People from County Tipperary
Pope John XXIII